World Lacrosse (WL), formerly the Federation of International Lacrosse, is the international governing body of lacrosse, responsible for the men's, women's, and indoor versions of the sport. It was established in 2008 by the merger of the previously separate men's and women's international lacrosse associations. Its headquarters are in 
Colorado Springs, Colorado, United States.

World Lacrosse has 77 members. It is the only international sport organization to recognize First Nations bands and Native American tribes as sovereign nations. The Iroquois Nationals (men) and the Haudenosaunee Nationals (women) of the First Nations Lacrosse Association represent the Haudenosaunee people of New York and Ontario.

World Lacrosse was given provisional recognition status by the International Olympic Committee in November 2018. In May 2019, the Federation of International Lacrosse launched a rebrand and changed its name to World Lacrosse.

In March 2022, due to the 2022 Russian invasion of Ukraine, Russian teams, athletes, and officials were suspended from participation in World Lacrosse events and qualifiers, and it was decided that no World Lacrosse or European Lacrosse Federation events would be held in Russia.

Tournaments
World Lacrosse organizes the World Lacrosse Championship, the Women's Lacrosse World Cup, the Under-19 World Lacrosse Championships for both men and women, and the World Indoor Lacrosse Championship.

Members

Continental Federations
 African Association of Lacrosse
 Asia Pacific Lacrosse Union
 European Lacrosse Federation
 Pan American Lacrosse Association

Source:

Awards

Predecessor organizations

International Lacrosse Federation
The International Lacrosse Federation (ILF) was founded in 1974 to promote and develop men's lacrosse throughout the world. Before 2008, the international governing bodies for men's and women's lacrosse were separate, which was one of the obstacles of lacrosse one day becoming an Olympic sport. In August 2008 in Lahti, Finland, the ILF and the International Federation of Women's Lacrosse Associations merged to become the Federation of International Lacrosse.

ILF Founders:
Thomas Hayes (USA)
Don Hobbs (Australia)
Laurie Turnbull (Australia)
Nigel Wade (England)

The ILF conducted the World Lacrosse Championship, World Indoor Lacrosse Championship and the men’s Under-19 World Lacrosse Championships, all of which were taken over by the FIL.

IFWLA
The International Federation of Women's Lacrosse Associations (IFWLA) was formed in 1972 to promote and develop women's lacrosse throughout the world. It wound up its affairs in August 2008 when it agreed to merge with the ILF to form the Federation of International Lacrosse.

Promoting all levels of lacrosse included IFWLA sponsorship of the Women's Lacrosse World Cup and the Women’s Under-19 World Lacrosse Championships, tournaments taken over by the FIL.

See also
 List of national lacrosse governing bodies
 Lacrosse at the Summer Olympics

References

External links
 
 2018-19 Annual Report

International lacrosse
Lacrosse governing bodies
Sports organizations established in 2008
2008 establishments in Canada